Operation FB (29 October – 9 November 1942) took place as part of the Arctic Convoys of the Second World War. The operation consisted of independent sailings by unescorted merchant ships between Iceland and Murmansk. In late 1942, the Allies had taken the offensive against Germany but the dispatch of supplies to the USSR by convoy via the Arctic route was suspended, due to the demands of the Mediterranean campaign. Convoy PQ 19 was cancelled because the Home Fleet diverted ships to the Mediterranean for Operation Torch (8–16 November 1942) which would have had to be postponed for three weeks had ships been provided for PQ 19.

Discussions between the British Prime Minister Winston Churchill and the US President Franklin D. Roosevelt led to ships being dispatched independently to Russia from Iceland as a substitute for PQ 19, using the polar night of the Arctic winter for concealment. The ships sailed at approximately twelve-hour intervals, with seven trawlers strung out along the routes as rescue ships. Of thirteen sailings to Russia, three were ordered to turn back and five arrived; of 23 independent departures from the USSR, 22 ships reached their destination. The outbound convoy series JW, began with Convoy JW 51A (15–25 December 1942), returns being called RW.

Background

Arctic convoys

The first convoy was due at Murmansk around 12 October and the next convoy was to depart Iceland on 22 October. A motley of British, Allied and neutral shipping loaded with military stores and raw materials for the Soviet war effort would be assembled at Hvalfjordur, Iceland, convenient for ships from both sides of the Atlantic.

By late 1941, the convoy system used in the Atlantic had been established on the Arctic run; a convoy commodore ensured that the ships' masters and signals officers attended a briefing before sailing to make arrangements for the management of the convoy, which sailed in a formation of long rows of short columns. The commodore was usually a retired naval officer, aboard a ship identified by a white pendant with a blue cross. The commodore was assisted by a Naval signals party of four men, who used lamps, semaphore flags and telescopes to pass signals, coded from books carried in a bag, weighted to be dumped overboard. In large convoys, the commodore was assisted by vice- and rear-commodores who directed the speed, course and zig-zagging of the merchant ships and liaised with the escort commander.

Due to the losses of Convoy PQ 18 (2–21 September) in the Arctic and Operation Torch (8–16 November) in the Mediterranean, for which more than 500 ships had to be escorted, much of the British Home Fleet was sent south. The United States and Britain suspended Arctic Convoys to the Soviet Union for the autumn. The US president Franklin D. Roosevelt had favoured sending PQ 19 but the British had replied that it would delay Torch for three weeks. Roosevelt suggested sending three smaller convoys with fewer escorts but Winston Churchill called this unrealistic. Soviet forces were fighting the Battle of Stalingrad (23 August 1942 – 2 February 1943) on the Eastern Front and the hiatus was much resented by the Soviet leadership, which judged British reasons for the cessation of Arctic convoys to be specious. the British claimed that the ceaseless Home Fleet operations amounted to a ratio of warships to convoyed merchant ships of nearly 1:1 on the Arctic run and that the British contribution to the Red Army in tanks and aircraft far exceeded that of the US.

Signals intelligence

The British Government Code and Cypher School (GC&CS) based at Bletchley Park housed a small industry of code-breakers and traffic analysts. By June 1941, the code-breakers could read quickly German Enigma machine cyphers in the Home Waters settings used by surface ships and U-boats. On 1 February 1942, the Enigma machines used in U-boats in the Atlantic and Mediterranean were made more complex, which the British were unable to read until December 1942 but German ships and the U-boats in Arctic waters continued with the older Enigma.

By mid-1941, British Y-stations were able to receive and read  W/T transmissions and give advance warning of  operations. In 1941, interception parties code-named Headaches were embarked on warships and from May 1942, specialist computers sailed with the cruiser admirals in command of convoy escorts, to read  W/T signals which could not be intercepted by the land stations in Britain. The Admiralty sent details of  wireless frequencies, call signs and the daily local codes to the computers. Combined with their knowledge of  procedures, the computers could give fairly accurate details of German reconnaissance sorties and sometimes predicted attacks twenty minutes before they were detected by radar.

Prelude

Convoy hiatus

In the Arctic autumn, the hours of daylight diminished until by midwinter there was only twilight at noon, conditions in which convoys had the best chance of evading German aircraft, ships and U-boats. The surviving ships of PQ 18 (2–21 September 1942) were still in Soviet ports, unloaded and waiting to return. Forty ships were ready to sail to the USSR in convoy PQ 19 but this convoy operation had suspended by the British, to the dismay of the US and the anger of the USSR. The suggestion that some ships should sail independently in the meantime, gained favour and a British ship owner, J. A. Bilmeir, offered cash bonuses in advance of £100 each for officers and £50 per rating to volunteers. The Russians had also asked that two Soviet ships at anchor in Iceland be sent back independently to Archangel.

 sailed on 11 August and  followed next day, both reaching Archangel, which increased optimism at the Admiralty, that the slower merchant ships that had been part of PQ 19 could emulate the feat in the lengthening Arctic nights. Churchill assured Roosevelt that any ships sent would be British with volunteer crews but this was not true. On 13 October, the cruiser  with destroyers  and  sailed for Archangel with a medical unit equipped for men suffering from wounds and exposure;  reconnaissance aircraft spotted the ships but they were not attacked. On return the ships carried the aircrew and ground staff of the two Hampden torpedo-bomber squadrons based in Russia during Operation Orator in September.

and 

From 24 to 28 September, the German cruiser Admiral Hipper and five destroyers conducted Operation Zarin, a sortie to mine the west coast of Novaya Zemlya. The Germans had intended to exploit the absence of much of the Home Fleet to attack convoys with Admiral Hipper but the weather was too bad for its escorting destroyers and an operation against Convoy QP 15 was cancelled. In November,  5, the German air command in Norway and Finland, was ordered to transfer its Ju 88 and He 111 bombers and torpedo-bombers to the Mediterranean against Operation Torch, a decision which the British received through Ultra intercepts. Only the Heinkel 115 floatplanes, suitable for torpedo attacks on stragglers and some Ju 87 dive-bombers remained in Norway, along with a few long-range reconnaissance aircraft to observe for the surface and U-boat forces.

Operation FB

29 October – 2 November

SS Richard H. Alvey and Empire Galliard sailed on 29 October, departing from Iceland at roughly twelve-hour [] intervals, British and American merchantmen making alternate sailings along with the Soviet vessel Dekabrist, which sailed with SS John Walker and Empire Gilbert on 20 October. SS John H. B. Latrobe, and Chulmleigh sailed on 31 October, SS Hugh Williamson and Empire Sky on 1 November. SS William Clark and Empire Scott sailed on 2 November followed by Daldorch on 3 November and Briarwood on 4 November. The ships took different routes and had the protection of submarine patrols north of Bear Island.

2 November 1942 – 24 January 1943

On 5 November, a Catalina north of Iceland spotted and sank  ( Reinhard von Hymmen). Chulmleigh went aground on the Sørkapp (South Cape) of Spitzbergen, the main island of Svalbard; unable to refloat and disabled by the bombing, it was abandoned and torpedoed by U-625 on 16 November. The crew suffered a six-week ordeal on Spitzbergen before being rescued by the Free Norwegian occupation force. On 6 November,  ( Hans Benker) sank  which was lost with all hands. Five British and US ships reached Russia and five Soviet ships sailing from Murmansk reached Iceland; with later sailings 22 ships arrived.

Convoy QP 15

Convoy QP 15 (convoy commodore, Captain W. C. Meek) was a return convoy of thirty empty merchant ships from the USSR and was the last of the QP series. The convoy sailed from Archangel on 17 November with 14 US, 8 British, 7 Soviet, one Panamanian merchant ship and the rescue ship Copeland. On US ship failed to set out and another ran aground, both being too late to catch up; the rescue ship Rathlin was also left behind with a damaged rudder. The convoy had a local escort of four minesweepers and the close escort comprised a minesweeper and four corvettes; the Soviet destroyers  and  accompanied until 20 November. Four British destroyers from Kola accompanying the convoy detached on 26 November with fuel shortage. Two British cruisers and three destroyers took station west of Bear Island and four submarines were sent to patrol near Altenfjord to deter surface raiders. The convoy could still be routed north of Bear Island and signals intelligence had revealed the transfer of the Luftwaffe bombers and torpedo-bombers to the Mediterranean.

On 20 November, a gale blew up and scattered the convoy in the seasonal perpetual darkness.  was badly damaged in the storm but managed to limp back to port; a large wave hit  and ripped off the stern.  reconnaissance aircraft were grounded and  ships stayed in port, as the British had hoped, when planning the convoy. Three Soviet destroyers were sent to assist  and managed to rescue 187 crew from the  but were not able to save the ship, which sank on 22 November. Neither of the two British groups of reinforcing destroyers found the convoy, which, west of Bear Island, had fragmented. On 23 November, the U-625 torpedoed and sank the British freighter Goolistan and later in the day,  sank the Soviet freighter ; both ships were lost with all hands. The rest of the merchant ships were reassembled in two groups and arrived in Loch Ewe in the north of Scotland on 30 November and 3 December.

Aftermath

Analysis

Three ships for north Russia were ordered to turn back after a U-boat sighting, four were sunk, one was wrecked and five arrived safely. On the return journey, 23 ships sailed for Iceland, one was sunk and 22 arrived. In 1956, the British naval official historian, Stephen Roskill, wrote that,

The tactic of independent voyages resembled the "patrol and independent sailings" of the First World War, which in 2004, Richard Woodman called an "absurd expedient" that was "quite useless". A similar initiative in early 1943 by the Soviet authorities for ships independently to make the westward journey, suffered one loss from 23 sailings. QP 15, the last of the PQ–QP convoys had departed Archangel on 17 November and arrived at Loch Ewe on 30 November. Subsequent convoys were given the codes JW for convoys to the USSR and RA for the return journey.

Ships

Eastbound

Soviet FB sailings

Other independent Soviet sailings
From 29 October 1942 – 24 January 1943, of the 23 ships sailing from the USSR, 22 arrived. (Data for this section taken from Ruegg and Hague (1993) unless indicated.)

 
  II
 
 
 
 
 OB

Notes

Footnotes

References

Further reading

External links
 Convoy web

Arctic naval operations of World War II
Arctic convoys of World War II
Economic aid during World War II
Military logistics of World War II
Military in the Arctic
Foreign trade of the Soviet Union
Naval battles and operations of World War II involving the United Kingdom